DFZ may refer to:

 Cosworth DFZ, an engine produced for Formula One racing
 Default-free zone, a collection of systems relating to Internet routing
 Deflazacort, a pharmaceutical drug